Angelique Kerber was the defending champion, but she decided not to participate this year.

Mona Barthel won the title, defeating Sara Errani in the final 7–5, 7–6(7–4).

Seeds
The top four seeds receive a bye into the second round.

Draw

Finals

Top half

Bottom half

Qualifying

Seeds

Qualifiers

Lucky losers
  Kiki Bertens

Draw

First qualifier

Second qualifier

Third qualifier

Fourth qualifier

References
 Main Draw
 Qualifying Draw

Open GDF Suez - Singles
Singles 2013